Sphaerodactylus heliconiae is a species of lizard in the family Sphaerodactylidae. It is endemic to Colombia.

References

Sphaerodactylus
Reptiles of Colombia
Endemic fauna of Colombia
Reptiles described in 1982